Alan Smith (8 June 1939 – 27 August 2016) was an English professional footballer who spent his entire professional career with Torquay United, making 278 appearances in the English Football League.

References

1939 births
2016 deaths
English footballers
Torquay United F.C. players
English Football League players
Association football defenders